For M/V Cape Texas, a World War II Type C1-A, see Type C1 Ships

MV Cape Texas (T-AKR-112} is a Roll-on/Roll-off (RO/RO) ship with the Ready Reserve Force (RRF) of the
United States Department of Transportation's Maritime Administration (MARAD). , her homeport is the Port of Beaumont in Beaumont, Texas, and she is on ROS-5 status; she is able to be fully operational within 5 days of being activated. When activated, she becomes part of the United States Navy's Military Sealift Command (MSC).

Design and Construction 

The vessel now known as Cape Texas was laid down by Howaldtswerke-Deutsche Werft in Kiel, Germany. She is a conventional RO/RO (Vehicle Carrier) ship with the superstructure aft, followed by twin funnels, and a stern ramp. For carrying US Army and Marine Corps combat vehicles, she has  of cargo capacity. She can carry 340 containers plus vehicles and her hull is ice strengthened.

Service history

Commercial Service 

US Government Service 
Cape Texas was purchased by the US Government in 1992 and acquired on 21 January 1993. On 19 August 1994, she was transferred to MARAD and became part of the Ready Reserve Fleet.

On 23 January 2003, Cape Texas was activated and placed “In Service” from the Ready Reserve Force to haul military cargo to the Middle East in support of Operation Iraqi Freedom. She proceeded to Corpus Christi, Texas, to load military vehicles and equipment. On 2 May 2003, she was placed "Out of Service” and returned to her Ready Reserve Force lay berth in Houston on a four-day recall status.

On 26 December 2004, she was again activated to MSC in continued support of Operation Iraqi Freedom. She was returned to the Ready Reserve Force on 7 April 2005 and returned to Houston.

Footnotes 

Notes

Citations

References 

 Printed References 

 Online

External links 

 

1977 ships
Ships built in Kiel
Transports of the United States Navy